Elise Hu is an American broadcast journalist who hosts the TED Talks Daily podcast  and serves as host-at-large for NPR. From 2015 to 2018, she was the network's first Seoul, South Korea, bureau chief.

Life and education
Hu was born in St. Louis, Missouri, to Chinese-American immigrants, and grew up in suburban Missouri and Texas. She graduated from Plano Senior High School in Plano, Texas. During high school, she and friends were paid $100 each to appear in national 7-Up advertisements, after which agents scouted Hu to work as a model for a few years into college. She interned at WFAA-TV in Dallas before earning a bachelor's degree in broadcast journalism from the University of Missouri School of Journalism.

She was married to Matt Stiles, a reporter, with whom she has three daughters. She speaks Mandarin Chinese.

Career
Hu began her career as a television reporter for stations including KWTX-TV, KVUE-TV and WYFF-TV, and then was among the founding journalists at the Texas Tribune, a digital news startup.

She joined NPR in 2011 and opened the Seoul bureau in early 2015, where she oversaw coverage of South Korea, North Korea and Japan. She hosted video series on NPR named "Elise Tries," which received a Gracie Award from the Alliance for Women in Media Foundation, and "Future You, With Elise Hu." As of 2020, she is host-at-large based at NPR West, filling in on programs such as "It's Been a Minute"; correspondent for Vice News; and co-founder of the podcast production company Reasonable Volume.

Her reporting has been honored with a National Edward R. Murrow Award for Video, a Gannett Foundation Award for Innovation in Watchdog Journalism, beat reporting awards from the Texas Associated Press. The Austin Chronicle twice named her "Best of Austin" for reporting and social media work.

Hu is a senior fellow at the USC Annenberg Innovation Lab, a director on the Grist.org board, and a member of the Council on Foreign Relations. She previously served as a guest co-anchor on Tech News Today on TWIT, an adjunct instructor for Georgetown University and an adviser and blogger for the John S. and James L. Knight Foundation.

References

External links
NPR bio
NPR's Seoul bureau announcement

Living people
American journalists of Chinese descent
American people of Taiwanese descent
University of Missouri alumni
NPR personalities
American women journalists
21st-century American women writers
21st-century American non-fiction writers
Year of birth missing (living people)
American women journalists of Asian descent